Lake of Maracaibo may refer to:
Laguna Maracaibo in Bolivia;
Lake Maracaibo in Venezuela.